The cast of the television series MythBusters perform experiments to verify or debunk urban legends, old wives' tales, and the like. This is a list of the various myths tested on the show as well as the results of the experiments (the myth is Busted, Plausible, or Confirmed).

Episode overview

Episode 137 – "Boomerang Bullet"
 Original air date: January 4, 2010
Adam and Jamie probe a potentially fatal three-way ricochet, while the Build Team tries to re-create medieval germ warfare by turning trees into catapults.

360° Ricochet

Conifer Catapult

Episode 138 – "Soda Cup Killer"
 Original air date: March 24, 2010
This episode was Jessi Combs's final appearance as a member of the Build Team.

Cup vs Car

Fall Guys

Episode 139 – "Dive to Survive"
 Original air date: March 31, 2010
Kari Byron returns to the series as of this episode.

Dive to Survive

Phonebook Freedom

Episode 140 – "Spy Car Escape"
 Original air date: April 7, 2010

Spy Car Escape
Based on countless car chase scenes from spy movies, the MythBusters try to test whether a pursuing car can be stopped or eluded using...

The MythBusters then built their own car-stopping devices.  They then attempted to see if a pursuer could be stopped with...

Vector Vengeance

Episode 141 – "Bottle Bash"
 Original air date: April 14, 2010

Bottle Bash

Leather Cannon

Episode 142 – "No Pain, No Gain"
 Original air date: April 28, 2010

No Pain, No Gain
Adam and Jamie subjected themselves to four painful stimuli – heat and electric current for Jamie, capsaicin (injected under the skin) and cold for Adam – and chose to use cold for their investigations. They then built a chair for test subjects to sit in, with an ice bath at  into which they would immerse one hand for as long as they could endure it, and imposed a 3-minute maximum. The following four myths were tested.

Gas Canister Rocket

Episode 143 – "Mythssion Control"
 Original air date: May 5, 2010

Crash Force
Jamie and Adam revisited the "Compact Compact" myth after fans complained about a claim Jamie made in the earlier episode. This was disputed by fans claiming that according to Newton's third law, two cars hitting each other at 50 mph is the same as one car crashing into a wall at 50 mph.

Knock Your Socks Off Revisit
The fans put forward a number of arguments, citing that the Build Team did not have a proper human analogue, and that they used elastic socks instead of non-elastic ones. The Build Team also decided to see whether hairy or hairless legs would be a factor in the myth.

Episode 144 – "Duct Tape Hour 2"
 Original air date: May 12, 2010

102 Uses for Duct Tape
The MythBusters and the Build Team investigate whether the "handyman's secret weapon" can be used to...

Episode 145 – "Waterslide Wipeout"
 Original air date: May 19, 2010

Waterslide Wipeout
Based on a viral video that can be found on YouTube, this myth was done by the MythBusters by fan request.

Left Hand Turn
This myth was based on claims that delivery companies use programs that calculate routes using as few left turns as possible to maximize fuel efficiency.

Episode 146 – "Fireball Stun Gun"
 Original air date: June 2, 2010

Fireball Stun Gun

Fireworks Man

Episode 147 – "Flu Fiction"
 Original air date: June 9, 2010

Fever Pitch
Adam and Jamie explore three myths associated with the common cold.

Tornado Decapitation

Episode SP14 – "Top 25 Moments"
 Original air date: June 16, 2010

A countdown of the cast's 25 favorite myths and moments to date, with comments from Adam, Jamie, and the Build Team. This was an 86-minute-long special.

Episode 148 – "Hair of the Dog"
 Original air date: October 6, 2010

Beat the Bloodhound, Part 2
A revisit of the "Fool the Bloodhound" myth from 2007. Adam and Jamie investigated new suggestions for evading detection by a scent hound, using the same dog (Morgan) and handler from that earlier episode. Given a five-minute head start, Jamie fled while using...

Adam and Jamie also explored a bloodhound's ability to single out a suspect from a group.

Beat the Sniffer Dog
Four contraband-detecting dogs – Buck, Rex, Gypsy, Max – and their handlers took part in a series of tests arranged by the Build Team. They investigated the possibility of fooling the dogs by...

Episode 149 – "Storm Chasing Myths"
 Original air date: October 13, 2010

Adam and Jamie team up with Sean Casey and Reed Timmer (from the series Storm Chasers) to investigate myths related to the power of tornadoes. The Build Team does not take part in this episode.

The episode includes a memorial to Sanjay Singh, an EMT and "Honorary MythBuster" who died in 2010.

Episode 150 – "Cold Feet"
 Original air date: October 20, 2010

When Feces Hit the Fan

Cold Feet
This myth is based on the popular saying "getting cold feet".

Episode 151 – "Tablecloth Chaos"
 Original air date: October 27, 2010
Adam and Jamie explore a large-scale version of an old magic trick, while the Build Team investigates a popular belief about brain activity.

Tablecloth Chaos

Brain Drain

Episode 152 – "Arrow Machine Gun"
 Original US air date: November 3, 2010
 Original UK air date: October 25, 2010

Arrow Machine Gun

Tipsy vs. Tired

Episode 153 – "Mini Myth Madness"
 Original air date: November 10, 2010

Request Fest
As a tribute to their fans, the MythBusters randomly drew six fan-submitted letters and tested the myths and questions in them. One letter contained three separate myths, bringing the total number of tests in this episode to eight.

Episode 154 – "Reverse Engineering"
 Original US air date: November 17, 2010
 Original UK air date: November 8, 2010

Reverse Engineering

Surf and Turf

Episode 155 – "Inverted Underwater Car"
 Original air date: November 24, 2010

Turn Turtle Car

Gas Room Boom

Episode 156 – "Bug Special"
 Original air date: December 1, 2010

Laptop Lift

The MythBusters take a crack at a bee-related myth based on a viral video.

Fly vs Water

According to the Build Team, this was one of the most demanded myths from the fans. The popular theory is that since water refracts light, it would confuse flies' compound eyes.

Biker vs Bug

Episode 157 – "President's Challenge"
 Original air date: December 8, 2010

Archimedes Solar Ray 3.0

President Obama challenges Adam and Jamie to revisit the Ancient Death Ray myth (Ancient Death Ray) originally aired September 29, 2004, and subsequently followed up in a 2006 revisit.

Car Flip

Episode 158 – "Green Hornet Special"
 Original air date: December 15, 2010
Seth Rogen, star of the 2011 film The Green Hornet, gives the cast two myths to test concerning the Green Hornet's car, Black Beauty.

Explosive Escape

Elevator Car Cut

Episode 159 – "Operation Valkyrie"
 Original air date: December 22, 2010

Valkyrie Boom

Slap Some Sense

References

General references

External links

 MythBusters Official site
 

2010 American television seasons
2010